Agnishala, Patan (Agniśālā aka Agnimatha or Agiṃmatha) is known as the temple of eternal fire, mostly worshiped by Newars of Kathmandu valley. It is located at Thabu near Kumaripati, Lalitpur. 

The temple is over six hundred years old and has recorded history of renovation by Prince Dharma Malla during 15 century CE.

References

Temples in Nepal
Hindu temples in Lalitpur District, Nepal